Diamaré  is a department of Far North (Extreme-Nord) Province in Cameroon. The department covers an area of 4,665 km and at the 2005 Census had a total population of 642,227. The capital of the department is at Maroua.

Subdivisions
The department is divided administratively into 9 communes and in turn into villages.

Communes
 Bogo
 Dargala
 Gawaza
 Maroua I (urban)
 Maroua II (urban)
 Maroua III (urban)
 Meri
 Ndoukoula
 Petté

See also
Communes of Cameroon

References

Departments of Cameroon
Far North Region (Cameroon)